Greg Goff (born September 24, 1970) is an American college baseball coach who and former pitcher. He is the head baseball coach at Purdue University. Goff played college baseball at Jackson State Community College from 1990 to 1991 and Delta State University from 1992 to 1993. He served as the head coach at the University of Montevallo from 2004 to 2007, Campbell University from 2008 to 2014, Louisiana Tech University from 2015 to 2016 and the University of Alabama in 2017.

Coaching career
Goff was hired as the head coach of the Alabama Crimson Tide baseball team on June 17, 2016. Goff led the Crimson Tide to a 19–34–1 season before being fired for possibly seeking to revoke some scholarships of players in violation of NCAA rules.

Goff was hired by Mark Wasikowski to join the Purdue Boilermakers baseball staff as a volunteer assistant. Because Goff accepted a volunteer position, Alabama still had to pay his salary over the length of his contract. On June 13, 2019, just two days after Wasikowski left to become the head coach at Oregon, Goff was promoted to head coach.

Head coaching record

References

External links
 Alabama Crimson Tide bio
 Louisiana Tech Bulldogs bio
 Campbell Fighting Camels bio

1970 births
Living people
Alabama Crimson Tide baseball coaches
Campbell Fighting Camels baseball coaches
Delta State Statesmen baseball players
Delta State Statesmen baseball coaches
Kentucky Wildcats baseball coaches
Louisiana Tech Bulldogs baseball coaches
Montevallo Falcons baseball coaches
Purdue Boilermakers baseball coaches
Southeast Missouri State Redhawks baseball coaches
Jackson State Generals baseball players
People from Jackson, Tennessee